The 1973 Chico State Wildcats football team represented California State University, Chico as a member of the Far Western Conference (FWC) during the 1973 NCAA Division II football season. Led by Pete Riehlman in his sixth and final season as head coach, Chico State compiled an overall record of 7–3 with a mark of 4–1 in conference play, sharing the FWC title with UC Davis. The team outscored its opponents 185 to 152 for the season. The Wildcats played home games at University Stadium in Chico, California.

Riehlman finished his tenure at Chico State with an overall record of 41–20, for a .672 winning percentage. That is the highest winning percentage of any head coach in the history of the Chico State Wildcats football program.

Schedule

Team players in the NFL
No Chico State players were selected in the 1974 NFL Draft.

The following finished their Chico State career in 1973, were not drafted, but played in the NFL.

References

Chico State
Chico State Wildcats football seasons
Northern California Athletic Conference football champion seasons
Chico State Wildcats football